The Presbyterian Church in Korea (HyukShin) was founded in 1973. The current name was adopted in 1975. It has 62,814 members and 72 congregations. It subscribes to the Apostles Creed, and the Westminster Confession of Faith. HyukShin has 7 Presbyteries and a General Assembly.

References 

Presbyterian denominations in South Korea
Christian organizations established in 1973